Perseus Books Group was an American publishing company founded in 1996 by investor Frank Pearl. Perseus acquired the trade publishing division of Addison-Wesley (including the Merloyd Lawrence imprint) in 1997. 

In 2005, Perseus acquired Client Distribution Services, the former distribution arm of Random House. It was named Publisher of the Year in 2007 by Publishers Weekly magazine for its role in taking on publishers formerly distributed by Publishers Group West and acquiring Avalon Publishing Group. After the death of Frank Pearl, Perseus was sold to Centre Lane Partners in 2015, a private equity firm. In April 2016, its name and publishing business was acquired by Hachette Book Group and its distribution business by Ingram Content Group.

In January 2007, the Perseus Books Group purchased Avalon Publishing Group, the parent company of Carroll & Graf and Thunder's Mouth Press; the purchaser folded both imprints and stopped publishing books under those names in May 2007.

In December 2018, Hachette Books became an imprint of Perseus Books Group. Concurrently, Da Capo Press and Da Capo's Lifelong became part of Hachette.

Imprints
The Perseus Books Group currently has the following imprints:

Avalon Travel
Moon Publications
Rick Steves (formerly John Muir Publications)
Basic Books
Basic Civitas
Seal Press
DaCapo
Hachette Books
Running Press
PublicAffairs
Nation Books

Former imprints
Before Avalon Publishing Group was integrated into the Perseus Books Group, it published on 14 imprint presses. In 2007, some of these imprints were integrated into the Perseus Books Group, while others folded or were sold to other companies. Perseus also sold one of their imprints in the restructuring process.

Avalon Publishing Group
Axoplasm
Black Square Editions
Blue Moon Books
Carroll & Graf Publishers — acquired in 1998, folded in 2007
Four Walls Eight Windows — absorbed into Thunder's Mouth Press in 2004
Marlowe & Company — absorbed into the DaCapo imprint
No Exit Press
Seal Press
Shoemaker & Hoard Publishers — sold to Counterpoint LLC
Thunder's Mouth Press — folded in 2007

Perseus Books Group
Counterpoint Press — sold to Counterpoint LLC
Vanguard Press started in 2007, closed in 2012
Weinstein Books - closed in 2017
Westview - sold to Taylor & Francis and absorbed into Routledge

Distribution
Perseus previously owned separate book distribution companies.

Publishers Group West (PGW), founded in 1976, based in Berkeley, California.
Consortium Book Sales and Distribution, founded in 1985, based in St. Paul, Minnesota.
Perseus Distribution, founded in 1999, based in New York City.
Legato Publishers Group, founded in 2013, based in Chicago.

References

External links
Perseus Books Group

Book distributors
Book publishing companies based in New York (state)
Publishing companies based in New York City
Publishing companies established in 1996
1996 establishments in New York (state)
Ingram family